Appfrica (sometimes referred to as Appfrica Labs) is a market research and technology firm founded by current CEO Jon Gosier in 2008 in Kampala, Uganda.   The firm has been responsible for a number of technology initiatives responsible for promoting Africa's technology sector including HiveColab, Apps4Africa, HiveColab, QuestionBox   and for helping Google Africa translate its page for Ugandan audiences.

Appfrica helps multinational firms do business in African markets by helping them understand consumer behavior, find local partners, and hire local talent.

Incubation, Apps4Africa, and HiveColab 

Appfrica is one of the oldest technology incubators in Africa, founded in 2008. In 2010 Africa spun out its incubation services into two new initiatives Apps4Africa and HiveColab. Apps4Africa began as a series of competitions that were launched in partnership with the U.S. Department of State. Later Apps4Africa announced an Acceleration program for African tech startups. HiveColab was founded as a free collaborative workspace in Kampala, Uganda that helped African technologists learn about tech and entrepreneurship. HiveColab is funded by Appfrica, IndigoTrust, and Hivos.

Open Data and Statfrica 

In 2013 Appfrica turned much of the research it has collected about Africa into Statfrica.com an online repository of information and open data for businesses, researchers and students.

References 

2008 establishments in Uganda
Market research organizations
Business incubators of Uganda
Technology companies of Uganda